The 1984–85 FA Cup was the 104th staging of the world's oldest football knockout competition, The Football Association Challenge Cup, or FA Cup. The competition was won by Manchester United, who defeated Everton 1–0 at Wembley, thus denying Everton the double just 3 days after winning the European Cup Winners' Cup. The final was also notable for seeing the first sending off, with Kevin Moran obtaining the unwanted distinction.

For information on the matches played from the Preliminary Round to the Fourth Qualifying Round, see 1984–85 FA Cup Qualifying rounds.

First round proper

Teams from the Football League Third and Fourth Division entered in this round plus Northwich Victoria, Bangor City, Altrincham and Telford United, were given byes. The first round of games were played over the weekend 17–19 November 1984. Replays were played on 19th-20th, except that for Swindon Town and Dagenham, which was played on 26th.

Second round proper

The second round of games were played over 7–8 December 1984, with replays being played on 11th, 12th and 17th.

Third round proper

Teams from the Football League First and Second Division entered in this round. Most of the third round of games in the FA Cup were played over the weekend 4–6 January 1985, with the exception of the Gillingham-Cardiff City match. Replays took place at various times over the period 8–28 January, however. The FA ordered the Leicester and Burton Albion game to be replayed behind closed doors after the Burton Albion goalkeeper had been struck by a bottle in the first game which had ended in a 6–1 win for Leicester.

Fourth round proper

The fourth round of games were mainly played over the weekend 26–27 January 1985. Some games were instead played or replayed on 29–30 January or 4 February.

Fifth round proper

The fifth set of games were intended to be played on 15–16 February 1985, but most of these matches were not played until 4 March, with replays taking place on 6th.

Sixth round proper

The sixth round of FA Cup games were played either at the weekend on 9–10 March or midweek on 13 March 1985. A replay was also played on this later date.

Former Everton manager Harry Catterick collapsed and died at the ground shortly after the first match between Everton and Ipswich Town.  Everton players wore black armbands in the replay in his memory.  The match between Luton Town and Millwall was suspended for 25 minutes by crowd violence.

Replay

Semi finals

Replay

Final

TV Coverage
The right to show FA Cup games were, as with Football League matches, shared between the BBC and ITV. As per the arrangements of the previous season four games were allowed to be screened Live from the Third round to the sixth and shared between the two companies, as well as the Final. For since 1970 ITV. Replays were shared between the two companies.

First Round 
BBC
Met Police v Dartford (Report only)

Second Round
BBC
Dagenham v Peterborough United (Report only)

ITV
Reading v Bognor Regis Town (Highlights shown nationally after the league game between Southampton v Arsenal with commentary from Peter Brackley

Third Round
BBC
Leeds United v Everton (LIVE-Friday Evening)
ITV
Fulham v Sheffield Wednesday
Hereford United v Arsenal
Liverpool v Aston Villa
Newcastle United v Nottingham Forest (Midweek replay)
Charlton Athletic v Tottenham Hotspur (Midweek replay)

Fourth Round
BBC
York City v Arsenal
Orient v Southampton
Grimsby Town v Watford
Wimbledon v Nottingham Forest (Midweek replay)
ITV
Liverpool v Tottenham Hotspur (LIVE-Sunday Afternoon)

Fifth Round
BBC
Blackburn Rovers v Manchester United (LIVE-Friday Evening)
Luton Town v Watford (Saturday 2nd replay)
ITV
York City v Liverpool
Everton v Telford United

Sixth Round
BBC
Manchester United v West Ham United
Everton v Ipswich Town
Luton Town v Millwall (Midweek)
Ipswich Town v Everton (Midweek replay)
ITV
Barnsley v Liverpool (LIVE-Sunday Afternoon)

Semi-Finals
BBC
Everton v Luton Town
ITV
Liverpool v Manchester United
Liverpool v Manchester United (Midweek replay)

Final
Everton v Manchester United shown Live by both the BBC & ITV.

References

 FA Cup Results Archive
 MOTD Listings 
 ITV Listings 
 Midweek Football Listings 

 
FA Cup seasons
1984–85 domestic association football cups
FA